Pupy y Los que Son, Son was the band of the Cuban musician Cesar "Pupy" Pedroso, founded in 2001. "Pupy" Pedroso died in July 2022.

Members
 Cesar Pedroso Fernández / Musical Director and Piano 
 Jóse Gómez Martinez / Lead Vocals 
 Armando Cantero Abreu / Lead Vocals 
 Lilibet Jove / Background Vocals 
 Gerardo Miro Rivera / Violin  
 Osiris Martínez Rodríguez / Keyboards
 Reinier Elizarde Ruanio / bass 
 Jóse Luis Quintana Fuerte / Pad
 Roelvis Reyes Simono / drums 
 Rene Suárez Zapata / Timbales  
 Julio Noroña Pérez / Güiro 
 Jorge Castillo Hernández / Congas  
 Leonardo Tereuel Velásquez / Trumpet 
 Juan Carlos Gonzáles Borrero / Trumpet
 Sergio R. Luna Longchamp / Trombone 
 Neuris Lorenzo Mustelier / Trombone

Discography

2001 - “Pupy y Los Que Son Son: Timba - The New Generation Of Latin Music" TERMIDOR MUSIKVERLAG (Deutschland)
Songs: 1.La voluminosa 2.El vecino se mujo 3.Que cosa tiene la vija 4.El gato no arana 5.Juegala 6.Te molesta que sea Feliz 7.Las mujeres son 8.Mamita portate bien 9.Vamos a gozar hasta fuera

2002 - “Que cosas tiene la vida” EGREM (Cuba)
Songs:  1. Que cosas tiene la vida, 2. El Vecino se mudó, 3. El Gato amaga, 4. Mamita pórtate bien, 5. La bomba soy yo, 6. Ay Papá, 7. El Pregonero, 8. Juégala, 9. Te molesta que sea feliz, 10. Seis Semanas

2003 - “De la Timba a Pogolotti” TERMIDOR MUSIKVERLAG (Deutschland)
Songs: 1.Ya tu campana no suena 2.Habla claro camara 3.Disculpeme senora 4.Ese huevo quiere sal 5.Parece mentira 6.Me falta un año 7.Rico timbalero 8.El bate de aluminio 9.Tu quisiera ser la fiera 10.Homenaje a ma'y pa2004 - “Pupy el buenagente” TERMIDOR MUSIKVERLAG (Deutschland)
Songs: 1. Buenagente, 2. Disco Azucar, 3. Dicen Que Dicen, 4. Tres Gordos, 5. Gato Por Liebre, 6. Figura Soy Yo, 7. Ay Lola, 8. Cuenta Decisiva, 9. Ven Pa' Que No Me Llore2005 - “Mi timba cerra” EGREM (Cuba)
Songs: 1.   	 De la Timba a Pogolotti, 2.  	La borrachera, 3.  	El puro, 4.  	La bala de Billy, 5.  	Si la ves, 6.  	La fiera, 7.  	Cuéntamelo todo, 8.  	Al final, 9.  	Del trabajo a la casa, 10.  	La vida es un carnaval, 11.  	Mi popurrit, 12.  	De la Timba a Pogolotti (Video track)2008 - "Tranquilo que yo controlo" EGREM (Cuba)
Songs: 1.Si me quieres conocer, 2.Se parece a aquel, 3.A la italiana, 4.Un poquito al reves, 5.bailalo hasta fuera(La Machucadera), 6.Vecina presteme el cubo, 7.Olvidala, 8.El barniz, 9.Cuando los an~os pasan (Casablanca), 10. Desde cero, 11.Ve bajando, 12.Calla, calla, 13.Nadie puede contra esto, 14.Si me quieres conocer repris2011 - "Siempre PUPY"''' EGREM (Cuba)Songs:'' 01. Mi musica, 02.Pirolo, 03.Oh no, 04.Julito, 05.La Loca, 06.Deja la Duda Belen, 07.La Batea, 08.Parece Mentira, 09.Al Final del 9no, 10.Caramelo con bombon, 11.La Habana, 12.El Loco

References

External links

 (Pupy y los que Son Son), 2011
 Pupy on Timba.com, english
 

Cuban musical groups
Musical groups established in 2001
Musical groups disestablished in 2022
2001 establishments in Cuba
2022 disestablishments in Cuba